Shyam Lal Sadhu (Kashmir, 1917-2012) was an Indian writer.

He had his early education at the C.M.S. Biscoe School, Srinagar. He took his degree in 1936 from S.P. College, Srinagar (University of Kashmir). He passed his M.A. in English literature at the University of Delhi in 1938. After working as a journalist, Sadhu became a lecturer at his alma mater, S.P. College. After teaching at various colleges as a professor in English Literature in Jammu and Kashmir State he became Principal at Government College, Sopore, and then at the V. B.  Women's College, Srinagar.

He wrote in English and in Kashmiri, and in the early 1950s published a collection of stories, Folk Tales from Kashmir.

He received some national awards and a UNESCO award for his book in Kashmiri on Vutsa Prang.

Works

In English

Non-English

References

1917 births
2012 deaths
Kashmiri people
Scholars from Jammu and Kashmir
20th-century Indian writers
Delhi University alumni
University of Kashmir alumni